Pyrausta obfuscata is a species of moth in the family Crambidae. It is found from Spain to Belgium and from France to the Balkan Peninsula, Ukraine and Russia.

Adults are on wing in July and August in one generation per year. They are active during the daytime on sunny days.

The larvae feed on Inula conyzae.

References

Moths described in 1763
obfuscata
Moths of Europe
Taxa named by Giovanni Antonio Scopoli